The Olympic-daero (also called Olympic Blvd ; Olrimpik Daero) is 8-lane highway located in Seoul. South Korea.

This route connects Seoul to Gimpo, Hanam and Gimpo International Airport, with a total length of 

This highway is a main route of Seoul, especially on the southern part of the Han River, and is connected directly with Gimpo Hangang Highway (West), and Seoul-Yangyang Expressway (East).

History
This Highway was built between 1982 and 1986 for the 1988 Summer Olympics.

 1982 : Beginning of Construction.
 May 2, 1986 : Opened to traffic.

List of facilities 
 IC: Interchange, JC: Junction, SA: Service Area, TG:Tollgate

See also
List of streets in Seoul
Gangbyeonbuk-ro

1986 establishments in South Korea
Roads in Seoul